Bắc Quang is a rural district of Hà Giang province in the Northeast region of Vietnam. As of 2019, the district had a population of 118 690. The district covers an area of 1,084 km2. The district capital lies at Vĩnh Tuy.

Administrative divisions
The district contains two towns, Việt Quang and Vĩnh Tuy, which is also the district capital, and the communes of Quang Minh, Tân Thành, Tân Quang, Tân Lập, Việt Vinh, Hùng An, Đồng Yên, Đông Thành, Vĩnh Phúc, Vĩnh Hảo, Tiên Kiều, Việt Hồng, Kim Ngẩu, Thượng Bình, Vô Điếm, Bằng Hành, Hữu Sản, Liên Hiệp, Đức Xuân, Đồng Tâm and Đồng Tiến.

References

Districts of Hà Giang province
Hà Giang province